New Kids on the Block is an American boy band, assembled in 1984 in Boston, Massachusetts.

New Kids on the Block may also refer to:
New Kids on the Block (album), the debut album by boy band New Kids on the Block
New Kids on the Block Live, the fifth concert tour by boy band New Kids on the Block
New Kids on the Block (TV series), animated TV series about boy band New Kids on the Block
"The New Kids on the Block", an episode of The O.C. (season 2)
"New Kids on the Block", an episode of Modern Family (season 11)
New Kids on the Block, a 2011 EP by Block B

See also
 "New Kid on the Block", episode of The Simpsons
 "New Kids on the Blecch", episode of The Simpsons
 New Kids (disambiguation)